Vatana (also Romanized as Vaţanā, Vaţanā’, and Vaţnā‘) is a village in Anzan-e Gharbi Rural District, in the Central District of Bandar-e Gaz County, Golestan Province, Iran. At the 2006 census, its population was 305, in 82 families.

References 

Populated places in Bandar-e Gaz County